Cryptobranchia kuragiensis is a species of sea snail, a true limpet, a marine gastropod mollusk in the family Lepetidae, one of the families of true limpets.

Description
As a member of the clade Patellogastropoda, Cryptobranchia kuragiensis are mostly gonochoric and broadcast spawners. In terms of their life cycle, embryos develop into planktonic trocophore larvae and later into juvenile veligers before becoming fully grown adults.

Distribution
Cryptobranchia kuragiensis can be found in the Northwest Pacific waters around Japan.

References

Lepetidae
Gastropods described in 1920